Kumru may refer to:

Kumru, Ordu, a town and district of Ordu Province in Turkey
Kumru, Cambodia
Kumru (sandwich), a Turkish sandwich

tr:Kumru (yiyecek)